Gary Knafelc (January 2, 1932 – December 19, 2022) was an American professional football player who was a wide receiver and a tight end in the National Football League (NFL) for ten seasons, primarily with the Green Bay Packers. He played one game at the start of his career with the Chicago Cardinals and his final season was with the San Francisco 49ers.

Biography 

Born and raised in Pueblo, Colorado, Knafelc graduated from its Central High School in 1950 and played college football at the University of Colorado in Boulder under head coach Dal Ward.

Knafelc was the 14th overall selection of the 1954 NFL draft, taken by the Chicago Cardinals, who traded him early that season to the Green Bay Packers.  Knafelc signed with the Packers as a free agent two games into the 1954 season. Knafelc is the only player to ever be carried off the City Stadium or Lambeau Field turf by fans. That happened after he caught an 18-yard touchdown pass from Tobin Rote in the final minute to beat the Detroit Lions, 20–17, in the 1955 season opener on September 25.

Knafelc was a member of Vince Lombardi's first two NFL title teams in 1961 and 1962, and was inducted into the Packers Hall of Fame in 1976. He was the public address announcer for Packers games at Lambeau Field from 1964 until 2004, when he was succeeded by Bill Jartz of WBAY-TV.

Knafelc died at his home in Clermont, Florida, on December 19, 2022, at the age of 90.

References

External links

 Packers.com – An Oral History – Gary Knafelc
 Greater Pueblo Sports Association Hall of Fame – Gary Knafelc

1932 births
2022 deaths
Sportspeople from Pueblo, Colorado
American football wide receivers
Colorado Buffaloes football players
Chicago Cardinals players
Green Bay Packers players
San Francisco 49ers players
American sports announcers
Players of American football from Colorado